Valle de Allende is the municipal seat and largest city of the municipality of Allende in the Mexican state of Chihuahua. Originally named Valle de San Bartolomé for Bartholomew the Apostle, it was founded in 1569 by Franciscan friars. The city is one of the oldest in Chihuahua.

The city received its current name in 1825 in honor of Ignacio Allende, a military leader during the Mexican War of Independence.

As of 2010, Valle de Allende had a population of 4,185.

Valle de Allende was the location of the fall, in 1969, of a scientifically important meteorite (known as Allende) that has become the most studied meteorite.

Notable people from Valle de Allende

 Octaviano Ambrosio Larrazolo - Governor of New Mexico and later US Senator.

References

External links
History of Valle de Allende (Spanish)

Populated places in Chihuahua (state)
Populated places established in 1569
1569 establishments in New Spain
1560s establishments in Mexico